α-Phenylcinnamic acid is a phenylpropanoid, or, more specifically, a derivative of cinnamic acid. It has the formula C15H12O2 and appears as an off-white crystalline solid.

Uses
α-Phenylcinnamic acid is frequently used as a compound synthesized in undergraduate laboratories to study the Perkin reaction, but is primarily seen as in intermediate or precursor to other, more useful phenylpropanoids.

Synthesis 
There are many ways to synthesize α-phenylcinnamic acid. Some of the more popular methods of formation include the condensation of phenacyl chloride with benzaldehyde in the presence of triethylamine, the distillation of benzylmandelic acid, or by the reaction of sodium phenylacetate with benzaldehyde in acetic anhydride. There are two isomers of this compound, differing in the geometry of the alkene. The E isomer, in which the two phenyl rings are cis to each other, is the major product formed by most synthetic routes. However, this compound can be converted using heat or ultraviolet light into a mixture containing nearly 50% of the Z isomer.  Decarboxylation of α-phenylcinnamic acid yields stilbene, with the (E) isomer producing cis-stilbene and the (Z)-isomer producing trans-stilbene.

References 

Enones